is a town located in  Hashima District, Gifu, Japan. , the town had an estimated population of 22,273 and a population density of 2200 persons per km2, in 8944 households.

Geography
Kasamatsu is located in the  Nōbi Plain in southern Gifu Prefecture, bordering on Aichi Prefecture. The Kiso River flows through the town, which is located in marshy flatlands and was often subject to flooding.  The town has a climate characterized by characterized by hot and humid summers, and mild winters  (Köppen climate classification Cfa).  The average annual temperature in Kasamatsu is 15.5 °C. The average annual rainfall is 1915 mm with September as the wettest month. The temperatures are highest on average in August, at around 28.0 °C, and lowest in January, at around 4.1 °C.

Neighbouring municipalities
Gifu Prefecture
Gifu
Kakamigahara
Hashima
Ginan
Aichi Prefecture
Ichinomiya

Demographics
Per Japanese census data, the population of Kasamatsu has remained steady over the past 50 years.

History
The area around Kasamatsu was part of traditional Owari Province until the course of the Kiso River shifted in 1586, after which time it was part of Mino Province. It was an ancient settlement on the important river crossing connecting Nagoya with Gifu.  During the Edo period, it was mostly tenryō territory controlled by Tokugawa shogunate through a bugyō. During the post-Meiji restoration cadastral reforms, the area was organised into Haguri District, Gifu Prefecture, which was subsequently transferred to Hashima District, Gifu. The modern town of Kasamatsu was formed on July 1, 1889. In expanded by annexing the neighbouring village of Matsueda on August 1, 1950 and the village of Shimoharugi on April 1, 1955. Plans to merge with the neighbouring city of Gifu were rejected by a referendum in June 2004.

Economy
The mainstay of the local economy is agriculture (rice, vegetables, dairy, poultry), and light industry (computer related products, dairy products, chemicals).

Education
Kasamatsu has three public elementary schools and two public middle schools operated by the town government, and one public high school operated by the Gifu Prefectural Board of Education.

Transportation

Railway
 Meitetsu - Nagoya Main Line

 Meitetsu - Takehana Line
 -

Highway
 Tōkai-Hokuriku Expressway

References

External links

 

 
Towns in Gifu Prefecture